Baker Branch is a stream in Monroe County in the U.S. state of Missouri. It is a tributary of Flat Creek.

Baker Branch has the name of Elisha Baker, an early citizen.

See also
List of rivers of Missouri

References

Rivers of Monroe County, Missouri
Rivers of Missouri